Christian Werner (May 19, 1892 in Stuttgart – June 17, 1932 in Stuttgart-Cannstatt) was a German racecar driver. He won the 1924 Targa Florio.

Indy 500 results

Source:

References

1892 births
1932 deaths
German racing drivers
Indianapolis 500 drivers
Racing drivers from Baden-Württemberg
Sportspeople from Stuttgart